David Rogers Chesnutt (1940 – December 15, 2014) was an American historian and editor.

Life
Chesnutt was born in Athens, Alabama, and earned academic degrees at University of Alabama (1962), Auburn University (1967) and the University of Georgia (1973).

Chesnutt was in the History Department at the University of South Carolina for  35 years as Research Professor. His major work was The Papers of Henry Laurens, serving as Associate Editor and then Editor.  As part of that project he was influential in moving the scholarly editing project to digital technologies, which was ground-breaking at the time.

For more than two decades Chesnutt served on the South Carolina Historical Records Advisory Board. He was an important figure in the foundation and early development of the Text Encoding Initiative and active in the  Association for Computers and the Humanities.

In 2005 Chesnutt was awarded the Order of the Palmetto, South Carolina's "highest civilian honor for extraordinary lifetime achievement and service to the state and nation".

Chesnutt died in Hardwick, Vermont, on December 15, 2014, of throat cancer.

Awards
 The Distinguished Service Award (with Charles Cullen (editor)) from the Association for Documentary Editing, 1985.
 The Lyman H. Butterfield Award from the Association for Documentary Editing, 1990,
 The Julian P. Boyd Award from the Association for Documentary Editing, 1995.
 The Order of the Palmetto from the Governor of South Carolina 2005.

Selected works 
 The Papers of Henry Laurens, 16 volumes, University of South Carolina Press, 1968 
 volumes 5–10 edited by George C. Rogers and Chesnutt; volumes 11–16 edited by Chesnutt and C. James Taylor; 
 South Carolina's Expansion into Colonial Georgia, 1720–1765, New York: Garland Pub., 1989,

References

External links
 David Rogers Chesnutt archive at the University of South Carolina Department of Rare Books and Special Collections.
 SEDIT-L Obit
 

1940 births
2014 deaths
University of Alabama alumni
Auburn University alumni
University of Georgia alumni
University of South Carolina faculty
American historians
American editors